Events from the year 1897 in Poland

Births 

 February 8 – Stanisław Milski in Czchów
 March 13 – Tadeusz Vetulani in Sanok
 March 16 – Józef Lange in Warsaw
 March 28 – Jerzy Zabielski in Warsaw
 July 7 – Michał Antoniewicz in Kraków
 December 5 – Władysław Świątek in Inowrocław

Deaths 

 August 26 – Maria Ilnicka in Warsaw
 June 16 – Antonina Hoffmann in Kraków
 Pavel Kuczynski

See also